USS Tulip is a name used more than once by the United States Navy:

 , a tugboat employed by the Union Navy during the American Civil War.
 , a lighthouse tender serving during World War I.

United States Navy ship names